Aleksandar Vasiljević (born 29 August 2001) is a Serbian football centre-back who plays for Al-Wasl.

References

External links
 
 
 
 

2001 births
Living people
Association football defenders
Serbian footballers
Serbian First League players
Serbian SuperLiga players
UAE Pro League players
FK Zemun players
FK Metalac Gornji Milanovac players
Al-Wasl F.C. players
People from Zemun
Serbian expatriate footballers
Serbian expatriate sportspeople in the United Arab Emirates
Expatriate footballers in the United Arab Emirates